Seydina Oumar Sy  (born October 10, 1937 in Kayes) is a Senegalese politician. He served as Foreign Minister of Senegal from 1990 to 1991.

References
Babacar Ndiaye and Waly Ndiaye, Présidents et ministres de la République du Sénégal, Dakar, 2006 (second edition), p. 404

1937 births
Living people
Foreign ministers of Senegal
Trade ministers of Senegal
People from Kayes
20th-century Senegalese politicians